Coward is the second studio album by American post-hardcore band Made Out of Babies, released on September 5, 2006. It was the second and last album by the band to be released through Neurot Recordings. The album was recorded and mixed by Steve Albini at Electrical Audio in Chicago with mixing by John Golden.

Track listing

Personnel
Made Out of Babies
 Brendan Tobin – guitars
 Eric Cooper – bass
 Julie Christmas – vocals
 Matthew Egan – drums

Production
 Steve Albini – engineering, mixing
 John Golden – mastering
 Norbert Gariety – cover photo

References

2006 albums
Made Out of Babies albums
Neurot Recordings albums
Albums produced by Steve Albini